Amortem is Finnish industrial metal band Ruoska's fourth album; it was released on 14 June 2006.

Track listing

"Intro" – 1.55
"Amortem" – 5.02
"Pure minua" – 4.09 ('Bite Me')
"Taivas palaa" – 4.21 ('The Sky is Burning')
"Järvet jäihin jää" – 4.45 ('The Lakes Remain Frozen')
"Sika" – 3.44 ('Pig')
"Viiden tähden helvetti" – 3.27 ('Five-star Hell')
"Mies yli laidan" – 3.32 ('Man Overboard')
"Tuonen orjat" – 4.21 ('Slaves of the Death')
"Alasin" – 4.23 ('Anvil')
"Kesä tulla saa" – 4.23 ('Summer may Come')

Personnel 

Patrik Mennander – vocals
Anssi Auvinen – guitar
Kai Ahvenranta – guitar
Mika Kamppi – bass
Sami Karppinen – drums

Music videos
These are the songs from this album that were made into a music video:
Mies yli laidan
Alasin

External links
English fansite

References

Ruoska albums
2006 albums